Eleven ships of the French Navy have borne the name Foudroyant ( literally "Like lightning", or "embodying the speed and violence of lightning"):
 , a 70-gun ship of the line
 , an 82-gun ship of the line
 Foudroyant, renamed Soleil-Royal in 1693
 , a 104-gun ship of the line
 , a 110-gun ship of the line
  (1751), an 80-gun ship of the line which in 1758 was captured by the British Navy, becoming 
  (1799), an 80-gun ship of the line
  a prame (a vessel propelled by oars and sails) of 12 guns of 24 pounds
 , a central battery and barbette battleship of the Redoutable type
 , a L'Adroit-class destroyer
  a  launched in 1938 as Fleuret and renamed in 1941; she was scuttled in 1942
  (S610), a ballistic missile submarine of the Redoutable type

Also, originally French ship Duguay-Trouin, was renamed Foudroyant before being scuttled.

See also

References

French Navy ship names